Amina Begum was a Bengali aristocrat from the Nawab family of Bengal and mother of Siraj ud-Daulah, the last independent Nawab of Bengal.

Early life and background
Amina Begum was the youngest daughter of Nawab Alivardi Khan, the Nawab of Bengal, and Princess Sharfunnisa, the paternal aunt of Mir Jafar. Her paternal grandfather was Mirza Muhammad Madani, who was of either Arab or Turkic descent, the son of a foster-brother of the Mughal emperor Aurangzeb. Her paternal grandmother belonged to the Turkic Afshar tribe of Khorasan. Through her, she was a relative of Shuja-ud-Din Muhammad Khan, the two having shared a common ancestor in Nawab Aqil Khan.

She married Zain ud-Din Ahmed Khan, who was appointed as the Naib Nazim (governor) of Patna by her father, Nawab Alivardi Khan. They had two sons, Ikram ud-Daulah and Siraj ud-Daulah.

Later life
In contrast to her elder sister Ghaseti Begum, Amina Begum was not very much involved in politics. In 1748, Amina was captured along with her two sons by the Afghan rebels of Mustafa Khan after they had killed her husband, Zain ud-Din Ahmed Khan, in an attempt to take control of Bihar. They were rescued by her father, Nawab Alivardi Khan, in 1751, who drove also drove out the Afghan rebels.

After the death of her father in 1756, her son Siraj succeeded the throne as the next Nawab of Bengal. Siraj was defeated by the British East India Company in the Battle of Plassey in 1757 partly due to the treachery of Amina's maternal cousin Mir Jafar. Amina Begum was subsequently imprisoned along with her other family members including her mother, sister, and daughter-in-law. They were exiled from Murshidabad on a boat travelling to Jahangirnagar (Dhaka) in 1758, and were kept confined in the Jinjira Palace.

Death

Mir Miran, the son of Mir Jafar, later ordered  for some of them to be released and recalled back to Murshidabad in 1760. On their way from Dhaka by boat, Amina Begum died when her boat was sunk on the orders of Miran. She was buried beside her family in Khoshbagh, Murshidabad.

References

1760 deaths
Nawabs of Bengal
Year of birth unknown
Indian Shia Muslims
People from Murshidabad district
Indian princesses
18th-century Indian women